The 18th Infantry Division (XVIII Merarchia Pezikou, XVIII MP) was an infantry division of the Hellenic Army that fought in the Battle of the Metaxas Line.

The division was formed in December 1940, under Major General Leonidas Stergiopoulos. It was subordinated to the Eastern Macedonia Army Section (TSAM) and faced the German attack on 6 April 1941 in the area of Mount Beles. The division was unable to halt the German attack, which outflanked TSAM and led to its surrender on 9 April.

References

Sources 
 

1940 establishments in Greece
1941 disestablishments in Greece
Infantry divisions of Greece
Military units and formations of Greece in World War II
Military units and formations established in 1940
Military units and formations disestablished in 1941